Vega Baja Fútbol Club is a Puerto Rican professional football club from Vega Baja that plays in the Puerto Rico Soccer League.

Current squad

References

External links 

Puerto Rico Soccer League teams